SV Werder Bremen retained its 6th place in Bundesliga with a solid season, in spite of key players Frank Rost and Torsten Frings leaving prior to the season. Coach Thomas Schaaf bought Johan Micoud as replacement for Frings, with the French ex-Parma player making an instant impact in Germany, while Ailton once again hit 16 goals, finishing third in the goal scoring charts.

Players

First-team squad
Squad at end of season

Left club during season

Reserve team

Werder Bremen's reserve team were managed by Thomas Wolter and finished 6th in the Regionalliga Nord.

Results

Bundesliga
 Arminia Bielefeld-Werder Bremen 3–0
 1–0 Bastian Reinhardt 
 2–0 Massimilian Porcello 
 3–0 Artur Wichniarek 
 Werder Bremen-Hamburg 2–1
 1–0 Angelos Charisteas 
 1–1 Tomáš Ujfaluši 
 2–1 Holger Wehlage 
 1860 Munich-Werder Bremen 3–0
 1–0 Markus Schroth 
 2–0 Harald Cerny 
 3–0 Martin Max 
 Werder Bremen-Nürnberg 4–1
 1–0 Ailton 
 1–1 Saša Ćirić 
 2–1 Johan Micoud 
 3–1 Ailton 
 4–1 Ailton 
 Energie Cottbus-Werder Bremen 0–1
 0–1 Tomislav Piplica 
 Werder Bremen-Bayer Leverkusen 3–2
 0–1 Thomas Brdarić 
 1–1 Ailton 
 2–1 Angelos Charisteas 
 3–1 Angelos Charisteas 
 3–2 Paul Stalteri 
 Bochum-Werder Bremen 1–4
 0–1 Ailton 
 1–1 Paul Freier 
 1–2 Angelos Charisteas 
 1–3 Ailton 
 1–4 Mladen Krstajić 
 Werder Bremen-Hansa Rostock 0–0
 Hannover-Werder Bremen 4–4
 1–0 Nebojša Krupniković 
 1–1 Frank Verlaat 
 2–1 Mohamadou Idrissou 
 2–2 Ailton 
 2–3 Angelos Charisteas 
 2–4 Johan Micoud 
 3–4 Fredi Bobić 
 4–4 Fredi Bobić 
 Werder Bremen-Borussia Dortmund 1–4
 0–1 Torsten Frings 
 1–1 Fabian Ernst 
 1–2 Dedê 
 1–3 Ewerthon 
 1–4 Ewerthon 
 Werder Bremen-Bayern Munich 2–0
 1–0 Markus Daun 
 2–0 Mladen Krstajić 
 Wolfsburg-Werder Bremen 3–1
 1–0 Martin Petrov 
 2–0 Robson Ponte 
 2–1 Johan Micoud 
 3–1 Stefan Effenberg 
 Werder Bremen-Kaiserslautern 5–3
 0–1 Lincoln 
 1–1 Frank Verlaat 
 1–2 Harry Koch 
 1–3 Christian Timm 
 2–3 Miroslav Klose 
 3–3 Ailton 
 4–3 Ailton 
 Hertha BSC-Werder Bremen 0–1
 0–1 Ailton 
 Werder Bremen-Stuttgart 3–1
 1–0 Ailton 
 1–1 Kevin Kurányi 
 2–1 Mladen Krstajić 
 3–1 Ailton 
 Schalke 04-Werder Bremen 1–1
 0–1 Markus Daun 
 1–1 Ebbe Sand 
 Werder Bremen-Mönchengladbach 2–0
 1–0 Markus Daun 
 2–0 Ailton 
 Werder Bremen-Arminia Bielefeld 2–2
 1–0 Viktor Skrypnyk 
 1–1 Mamadou Diabang 
 2–1 Ailton 
 2–2 Cha Doo-Ri 
 Hamburg-Werder Bremen 1–0
 1–0 Sergej Barbarez 
 Werder Bremen-1860 Munich 1–2
 1–0 Ivan Klasnić 
 1–1 Markus Schroth 
 1–2 Daniel Borimirov 
 Nürnberg-Werder Bremen 1–0
 1–0 Lars Müller 
 Werder Bremen-Energie Cottbus 0–1
 0–1 Marko Topić 
 Bayer Leverkusen-Werder Bremen 3–0
 1–0 Daniel Bierofka 
 2–0 Sebastian Schoof 
 3–0 Juan 
 Werder Bremen-Bochum 2–0
 1–0 Ailton 
 2–0 Ivica Banović 
 Hansa Rostock-Werder Bremen 1–0
 1–0 Dietmar Hirsch 
 Werder Bremen-Hannover 1–2
 1–0 Ailton 
 1–1 Fredi Bobić 
 1–2 Fredi Bobić 
 Borussia Dortmund-Werder Bremen 1–2
 1–0 Márcio Amoroso 
 1–1 Angelos Charisteas 
 1–2 Fabian Ernst 
 Bayern Munich-Werder Bremen 0–1
 0–1 Johan Micoud 
 Werder Bremen-Wolfsburg 0–1
 0–1 Marino Biliškov 
 Kaiserslautern-Werder Bremen 1–0
 1–0 Miroslav Klose 
 Werder Bremen-Hertha BSC 4–2
 0–1 Arne Friedrich 
 1–1 Mladen Krstajić 
 2–1 Ludovic Magnin 
 3–1 Angelos Charisteas 
 4–1 Angelos Charisteas 
 4–2 Thorben Marx 
 Stuttgart-Werder Bremen 0–1
 0–1 Rui Marques 
 Werder Bremen-Schalke 04 2–1
 1–0 Angelos Charisteas 
 1–1 Victor Agali 
 2–1 Johan Micoud 
 Mönchengladbach-Werder Bremen 4–1
 1–0 Peer Kluge 
 2–0 Morten Skoubo 
 3–0 Morten Skoubo 
 3–1 Bernd Korzynietz 
 4–1 Mikael Forssell

Statistics

Topscorers
  Ailton 16
  Angelos Charisteas 9
  Johan Micoud 5
  Mladen Krstajić 4

Notes

References

Sources
Soccerbase.com – Results & Fixtures for W Bremen

SV Werder Bremen seasons
Werder Bremen